Esmaili-ye Sofla or Esmaili Sofla may refer to:
 Esmaili-ye Sofla, Ilam
 Esmaili Sofla, Kerman